The 2001–02 season was Birmingham City Football Club's 99th in the Football League. They finished in 5th position in the 24-team Football League First Division, thus qualifying for the play-offs, and were successful in the final, beating Norwich City in a penalty shootout to gain promotion to the Premier League. Birmingham entered the 2001–02 FA Cup at the third round and lost to Liverpool in that round, and after entering the League Cup in the first round, lost to Manchester City in the third.

Trevor Francis was dismissed as manager in October with Birmingham mid-table in the First Division. Mick Mills and Jim Barron acted as caretakers until December, when former Crystal Palace manager Steve Bruce was appointed. French manufacturers Le Coq Sportif supplied Birmingham's kit for the fourth consecutive season, and mobile phone retailer Phones4U were the new shirt sponsors. Tommy Mooney was top scorer with 15 goals, of which 13 were scored in the league.

Football League First Division

Trevor Francis was dismissed as manager in October with Birmingham mid-table in the First Division. Mick Mills and Jim Barron acted as caretakers until December, when former Crystal Palace manager Steve Bruce was appointed. Under his management Birmingham improved to finish fifth in the First Division for the third season running, qualifying for the play-offs yet again. This season, however, Birmingham finally tasted success: after beating Millwall 2–1 on aggregate in the semi-final, they faced Norwich City in the play-off final at the Millennium Stadium. After normal time ended goalless, the match went to extra time, only for Norwich's Iwan Roberts to score in the first minute of extra time. However, Geoff Horsfield equalised 11 minutes later and, with no further goals, the match went to a penalty shoot-out. Birmingham won 4–2 to finally gain promotion to the Premier League, 16 seasons after their previous top-flight campaign.

Match details

League table (part)

Results summary

Play-offs

Final

FA Cup

League Cup

Transfers

In

 Brackets round club names indicate the player's contract with that club had expired before he joined Birmingham.

Out

 Brackets round a club denote the player joined that club after his Birmingham City contract expired.

Loan in

Loan out

Appearances and goals

Numbers in parentheses denote appearances as substitute.
Players with squad numbers struck through and marked  left the club during the playing season.

See also
 List of Birmingham City F.C. seasons

References
General
 
 
 Source for match dates, league positions and results: 
 Source for lineups, appearances, goalscorers and attendances: Matthews (2010), Complete Record, pp. 438–39.
 Source for goal times: 
 Source for transfers: 

Specific

2001-02
Birmingham City